John Compton (born John Compton Tolley; June 21, 1923 – May 12, 2015) was an American actor.

Compton was born John Compton Tolley in Lynchburg, Tennessee.

In 1943, Compton left Lynchburg and went to Hollywood hoping to become an actor. He washed dishes at a restaurant and spent time around union halls seeking a break in the film industry. His next job was answering a telephone at Columbia Pictures Studio. Eventually he paid $100 to get a bit part in a film, but the results of that appearance offered little hope for his future. He gained experience by acting in other films, in summer stock theater, and on stage in New York.

Compton starred in the television series The D.A.'s Man (1959). He appeared in the films Mildred Pierce, Cheyenne, Jesse James Rides Again, Oh! Susanna, Thunder Over Arizona and Spoilers of the Forest, among others.

Compton also sold real estate in California.

He died of natural causes on May 12, 2015, in Los Angeles, California at age 91.

Filmography

References

External links
 

1923 births
2015 deaths
20th-century American male actors
American male film actors
People from Lynchburg, Tennessee